Skeet Reese is a professional sport fisherman of the B.A.S.S. (Bass Anglers Sportsmans Society) and Major League Fishing. He was born in Walnut Creek, California on June 30, 1969. He has a wife, Kim, and a two daughters, Leamarie and Courtney. Reese is one of the primary spokesmen for General Tire.

On September 15, 2007, Skeet became the 2007 B.A.S.S. Toyota Tundra Angler of the Year.

Skeet won the 2009 Bassmaster Classic in Shreveport, LA, on February 22, 2009 with a total weight of 54 pounds 13 ounces.

Stats 
Years pro: 14 
Top 10 finishes:  59 
First place finishes: 6
Second place finishes: 10
Career earnings: $2,545,553.64
Current World rank: 14 
Current Bassmaster standing: 2 (295 points)
Total Weight: 5,846 lbs 10oz
2007 B.A.S.S. Toyota Tundra Angler of the year 
Best finish in 2006: 2 - Potomac River, 8/10/2006
Best finish in 2007: 2 - Lay Lake, 2/23/2007 
Best finish in 2008: 9 - Clarks Hill, 5/1/2008
Best finish in 2009: 1 - Red River, 2/22/2009
Best finish in 2010: 1 - Smith Mountain Lake, 4/19/2010 
Bassmaster Classics: 11 (fished)
Bassmaster Classic Titles: 1

Angler Information  

Home Lake: Clear Lake (CA) 
Favorite Lake: Clear Lake (CA) - "It's a phenomenal fishery, but Lake  Champlain comes pretty close." 
Least Favorite Lake: Lake Toho (FL) - "I just can't figure the fish out there." 
Favorite Technique: Flipping and pitching 
Primary Fishing Strength: Mental toughness 
Secondary Fishing Strength: Flipping and pitching 
Biggest Weakness: Cranking deep structure 
Boat: RANGER 
Motor: Mercury 
Team: Lucky Craft 
Fishing Sponsors: Lowrance, MotorGuide, Lucky Craft, Berkley Trilene, Abu Garcia, Fish Hedz, Wiley X

External links
 Extensive stats
 Skeet Reese Official Website
 http://www.bassmaster.com/anglers/skeet-reese
 http://sportsexpos.com/images/oldwp/2009/06/skeetReese.jpg

Living people
1969 births
American fishers